The Oaxaca class are offshore patrol vessels, constructed and designed by and for the Mexican Navy. The class is named after the Mexican state of Oaxaca. The Mexican Navy has requested seven of these ships with four already in service, three in construction, which were disclosed on June 1  on the Navy anniversary, with the name PO-163 Independencia, which is to celebrate the 200th anniversary of the Independence of Mexico. Also, another ship PO-164, named Revolucion, is in the process of raising the Mexican flag in a couple of months. Two more to be constructed in Navy's Naval Shipyards.

Description
They  displace .

Primary armament is a single OTO Melara  naval gun or Bofors 57 mm gun. They also mount a pair of OTO Melara remote controlled naval turret Mod. 517 with M2  machine guns, one on each side. At the rear atop the helicopter hangar is a single OTO Melara  cannon. The class has a helipad on the afterdeck with handling capabilities for a variety of helicopters, such as the Panther, Fennec, or the Bolkow B-105 Super-5. The ships carry a complement of 77, and have provisions to carry a group of 39 special forces and/or marines for a variety of missions.

The Oaxaca class also carries a CB-90 HMN Patrol Interceptor in its well deck.

For the 2008 fiscal year, the Mexican Congress approved $68 million in funds to build two more Oaxaca-class ships, and pledged an additional $40 million in 2009.

Mission

The objectives for the Oaxaca class are oceanic surveillance, search and rescue operations, support for the civilian population in case of disasters, maritime support and to act as a deterrence against hostile ships and aircraft in low-medium intensity conflicts.

Ships

References

 Wertheim, E. (2007) Naval Institute Guide to Combat Fleets of the World: Their Ships, Aircraft, and Systems. 15 edition. US Naval Institute Press.

External links

 Secretaria de Marina, Armada de Mexico : Patrol Boats 
 OTO Melara Small Calibres 
 Photograph of Oaxaca class

Patrol vessels of the Mexican Navy
 
Patrol ship classes